Sekolah HighScope Indonesia is a national-plus school based in Jakarta, Indonesia, established in 1996. The director is Antarina S.F. Amir. The school is based on the HighScope Research Foundation Development curriculum, of which the institute itself is located in Ypsilanti, Michigan. Sekolah HighScope Indonesia's first location is in Pondok Indah, South Jakarta. At first, the school only included the early childhood program, and during its first days of operation, HighScope Indonesia only had 8 students. A second campus is located on the Aston Jakarta hotel, located somewhere in Kuningan, South Jakarta. A third campus, now closed, had previously occupied a house that was only a walk away from Pondok Indah Mall. In 2000, HighScope Indonesia opened the Elementary program, which was previously located in a house in Cilandak, South Jakarta. They started with only one classroom, which doubled to three classrooms prior to moving to a new campus in Jl. TB Simatupang, West Cilandak, Jakarta Selatan, Daerah Khusus Ibukota Jakarta, in June 2002. In 2005, the Middle School program was opened, allowing 5th grade students to promote to 6th grade, without even having to leave the school. The latest was the High School program, located on the 5th floor on the second building of the campus.

School Program & Curriculum
Compared to other schools in which classes are grouped according to their grades, Sekolah HighScope Indonesia uses the multiage system, in which classes are grouped according to the student's age. For example, a 6th grade class is mixed with 7th grade students, which ranges from students aged 11–14 years old, and 8th grade students mixed with 9th grade students, ages ranges from 13 to 16. Since 2003, the school has issued a dual language curriculum, which includes Indonesian and English languages.

Sekolah HighScope Indonesia issues a multi-lesson program, notably notified as the "Integrated Studies" program. The program alternates English and Indonesian as a provisional topical language. Students are required to make a report, a product, and a slide-show presentation used as a secondary presentation material.
High/Scope has been known to have many homeworks to practice their skills while free time is available at each student's place of residence.

HighScope Approach

Sekolah HighScope Indonesia focuses on students learning on real-life activities in daily life, the promotion of technology for learning, and focusing on respect. Since the conception of the Elementary Program in 2000, High/Scope Indonesia has created a simple pledge that is called "Habits of Empowerment". This pledge hopes to bring students progressive mannerisms at school. Which is mandatory to be read every morning and not mentioned on Indonesian days, as issued in 2003. Which reads:

The Highscope approach tries to instill core values of Respect, Responsibility, Excellence, and Integrity, embedded in the school culture. These core values will accompany students towards developing an ethical character. Additionally, the HighScope approach also has a philosophy called "Learner Outcomes". It is intended for students as a guide and to be prepared with the necessary skills along the course, namely Social Problem solving, Adaptability and Agility, Meta-level reflection, Ethical leadership, Expert thinking, Communication, Creativity and innovation, and Collaboration.

Other locations
Campuses inside Jakarta
TB Simatupang, South Jakarta
Kuningan, Central Jakarta
Bintaro, South Jakarta
Kelapa Gading, North Jakarta
Alfa Indah, Joglo, Kembangan District, West Jakarta
Pluit, North Jakarta

Outside Jakarta
Medan, North Sumatra
Bandung, West Java
Bali
Rancamaya, Bogor, West Java
Palembang, South Sumatra
Bekasi, West Java

References

. (Retrieved on 2009-08-03)

External links
High/Scope Indonesia Official Website

Schools in Indonesia
National Plus schools
1996 establishments in Indonesia
Educational institutions established in 1996
Schools in Jakarta